The Digo (Wadigo in Swahili) are a Bantu ethnic and linguistic group based near the Indian Ocean coast between Mombasa in southern Kenya and northern Tanga in Tanzania. In 1994 the Digo population was estimated to total 305,000, with 217,000 ethnic Digo living in Kenya and 88,000 (1987 estimate) in Tanzania. Digo people, nearly all Muslims, speak the Digo language, called Chidigo by speakers, a Bantu language. They are part of the greater Mijikenda ethnic group of people which contains nine smaller groups or tribes, including the Duruma, Giriama, and others.. The Digo in Tanzania are the native inhabitants of Mkinga and Tanga districts of Tanga Region and are a major cultural group there.

Culture 
Due to the growing influence of Swahili culture, some Digo began converting to Islam in the 19th century. Islam soon spread further among the Digo and the majority were Muslim by the 1940s.

References

Mijikenda